Koç Holding A.Ş. is the largest industrial conglomerate in Turkey, and the only company in the country to be listed on the Fortune Global 500 as of 2016. The company, headquartered in Nakkaştepe, Istanbul, is controlled by the Koç family, one of Turkey's wealthiest families.

The company was formed in 1963 when founder Vehbi Koç, who established his first firm in 1926, combined all the companies bearing his name into Koç Holding.

History 
The first firm that was to become Koç Holding was established in 1926 by Vehbi Koç.

In 1984, Vehbi Koç handed his position as chairman of the board over to his son Rahmi M. Koç.

In September 1988, the company moved its headquarters from Fındıklı, Istanbul, to Nakkaştepe on the Anatolian part of Istanbul.

On April 4, 2003, Rahmi Koç retired and handed his position over to his eldest son Mustafa V. Koç. Rahmi Koç retained the title of honorary chairman and a seat on the board of directors.

In February 2015, Levent Çakıroğlu replaced Turgay Durak as CEO.

In 2016 Q1, Omer Koc became the chairman of the board following the death of Mustafa V. Koç.

Operations
The shares of 16 Koç Group companies are traded on the Istanbul Stock Exchange; together, the groups comprise 113 companies, 90,000 employees, and 14,000 dealers, agencies, and after-sales services people.

Group companies

References

External links 
 

Conglomerate companies of Turkey
Companies listed on the Istanbul Stock Exchange
Companies based in Istanbul
Defence companies of Turkey
Koç family
Üsküdar
Conglomerate companies established in 1926
Holding companies of Turkey
Turkish companies established in 1926
Holding companies established in 1926
1970s initial public offerings